The Municipality of St Peters was a local government area of Sydney, New South Wales, Australia. It was originally proclaimed as the Municipal District of St Peters on 13 January 1871. With an area of 4.2 square kilometres, it included the modern suburbs of St Peters, Tempe and Sydenham. The council was amalgamated with the Municipality of Marrickville, along with the Municipality of Petersham, with the passing of the Local Government (Areas) Act 1948, and is now  part of the Inner West Council.

Council history
The Municipal District of St Peters was first proclaimed on 13 January 1871. At the time the population was at about 3500, with 1088 houses within the
municipal area. The Mayor of Marrickville, Charles St Julian, was appointed as the Returning Officer conducting the first election, and the first council was declared elected on 14 February 1871. The council comprised six aldermen elected to two wards, St Peter's Ward and Cook's River Ward, which each returned three aldermen. On 2 May 1878 a third ward, Brompton Ward, was added, bringing the total number of aldermen to nine.

The first elected council:

By the late 1890s, the municipality had grown in population to around 7000, with manufacturing and industry playing a greater role, particularly brickworks fed by clay from the Cooks River. An 1899 profile of the suburb in the Australian Town and Country Journal noted in this regard: "St. Peters is mainly a residential suburb, but it can boast of some industries, and on its borders are situated a number of very prosperous brickworks. There are portions of the district which are admirably adapted for manufacturing purposes, and no doubt in course of time full advantage will be taken of these opportunities." On 18 December 1903, the wards were rearranged to North Ward, Bellevue Ward and Tempe Ward. On 17 December 1919, a fourth ward was added when Brompton Ward was recreated.

Later history
By the end of the Second World War, the NSW Government had come to the conclusion that its ideas of infrastructure expansion could not be realised by the present system of the mostly-poor inner-city municipal councils and the Minister for Local Government, Joseph Cahill, passed a bill in 1948 that abolished a significant number of those councils. Under the Local Government (Areas) Act 1948, St Peters Municipal Council was merged, along with Petersham council, with the neighbouring Municipality of Marrickville which was located to the North.

Mayors

Town Clerks

References

External links

St Peters
St Peters
Mayors
1871 establishments in Australia
1948 disestablishments in Australia